John le Taverner (fl. 1295–1313) was an English politician. He was the member of parliament for Bristol in Edward I's Model Parliament in 1295 and again in 1298 and 1306. He was mayor of Bristol in 1308, 1309 and 1313.

References

Year of birth missing
14th-century deaths
English MPs 1295 
English MPs 1298
English MPs 1306
Members of the Parliament of England for Bristol
Mayors of Bristol